Rhodes is a hamlet or small village alongside the wild trout rich Bell River, near Ben Macdhui (at 2561 m the highest mountain in the Cape region) in the Drakensberg mountains of the north Eastern Cape, South Africa.

History 
Rhodes is located in the Eastern Cape Highlands, near the escarpment in the southernmost end of the mighty Drakensberg mountain range in the magisterial district of Barkly East. It is 1,832 m above sealevel and is 16 km due south of the Mountain Kingdom of Lesotho. The village is surrounded by the towns of Maclear, Ugie and Elliot below the escarpment and Barkly East above this barrier. It is 60 km or 60-plus minutes drive from Barkly East, which is the closest town, on a poorly maintained gravel road which is narrow, winding and must be driven with care.

The farm Tintern, owned by Mr J A Vorster, was advertised for sale in 274 erven or lots on 16 September 1891. In September 1894, the erf-holders and residents met to petition the government to proclaim Rhodes as a village under the Village Management Act of 1881. Rhodes was proclaimed a township with municipal rights in 1897.

Between 24 June 1901 and 7 February 1902, the village was invaded no less than 29 times during the Second Boer War.

Local legend has it that it was originally named Rossville after Ds Ross and that the name was changed to Rhodes in the hopes that the mining magnate and then Prime Minister of the Cape, Cecil John Rhodes, would bless the village with his beneficence. Alas, this was not to be and the legend has it that he sent a wagonload of Stone Pine trees instead. Another variation has it that he sent the trees as well as £500. The story continues that the funds disappeared together with the official who received them. More recent speculation would have it that the trees could not have been donated by Rhodes as the species reputed to have been supplied by him have a life-expectancy which has long been exceeded.

Ds Ross, who was based in Lady Grey, ministered to the community, travelling to and fro on horseback. Although of English-speaking origin, he was interned during the Second Boer War. Prior to the war, he conducted his services alternately in English and Afrikaans. Clothed in rags and having walked bare-footed from the Aliwal North concentration camp to his home in Lady Grey after his release, he was thoroughly disgusted with the British and refused to conduct his services in English thereafter.

The majority of buildings were constructed around the turn of the century and the village continued to grow and prosper, its heyday being between 1911 and 1945. The advent of the "Wool Boom" of the 1950s provided a brief upsurge but the riches gained were soon spent. At this time, wool was sold for a pound (£) for a pound. A gradual decline set in after this flash-in-the-pan and which continued into the 70s as witnessed by the eventual closure of the white school in 1976. Municipal status was relinquished in 1979 and control ceded to the local authority, the then Drakensberg District Council, now known as Joe Gqabi District Municipality. A brief upsurge followed with the advent of the so-called "Hippie Era".

Activities & annual events 

Rhodes is the home of three significant sporting events, the oldest of which is the Rhodes Trail Run. This is a 52 km event held in the heart of winter which starts and ends in the village.

Billed as "The Most Extraordinary Mountain Biking Race in Africa", the Rhodes Mountain Bike Challenge, it was held in October each year, is an 82 km grind. More recently, the race date has been changed to September. The route follows the road to Naude's Neck and then off past the Tenahead Lodge, the Cairntoul Stock Theft Unit Police Station and along the Lesotho border to pass the Tiffindell Ski Resort and back to Rhodes via the Carlislehoekspruit Pass.

The annual Wild Trout Festival is based in Rhodes and is organised by the Wild Trout Association. The field is limited to 40 participants who fish for three days on the 180 km of running water which is within an hours drive of the village.

A number of 4x4 vehicle routes are available in the area. Using Rhodes as a starting and end point, day trips of varying length can be planned depending on requirements and time available. Being off the beaten track, it is important to be prepared as the weather can and does change at short notice. Rhodes is also central to 8 mountain passes in the district that have become very popular in more recent years.

Rock art by members of the various San communities abounds in sandstone valleys in the area and can be viewed by prior arrangement only.

Geography

Climate
Rhodes has a subtropical highland climate (Cwb, according to the Köppen climate classification), with mild summers and chilly, dry winters, with occasional snowfalls.

References

External links
 Official Site

Populated places in the Senqu Local Municipality